Schnee is a surname of German origin, meaning "snow". People with this name include:

 Bill Schnee - recording engineer, music producer
 Charles Schnee (1916–1963), screenwriter 
 Charles H. Schneer (1920–2009), film producer
 Gary Schnee, American curler
 Heinrich Schnee (1871–1949), Governor of German East Africa during World War I
 Walter Schnee (1885–1958), mathematician
 Weiss Schnee, a character in the animated web series RWBY
 Winter Schnee, the older sister of Weiss Schnee in the animated web series RWBY

 Schnee Eifel, a heavily wooded landscape in Germany's Central Uplands

German-language surnames